Paul Osakpamwan Ogbebor (1939-2020) was a Nigerian military officer and civil war veteran. He was the first Nigerian to be enrolled in the cadets of course 1 of the Nigerian Defence Academy.

Early life and education 
Ogbebor was born on May 24, 1939, in Benin City, Edo state, Nigeria. He had his military education at the Nigerian Defence Academy, NDA.

Death 
Lt Colonel Ogbebor died on February 19, 2020, in Benin City, Edo State, Nigeria.

Reference 

People from Edo State
1939 births
2020 deaths
Nigerian military officers